Mehr Gerd (also Romanized as Mehr Gard) is a village in Vardasht Rural District, in the Central District of Semirom County, Isfahan Province, Iran. At the 2006 census, its population was 757, in 172 families.

References 

Populated places in Semirom County